Jerome Douglas Cooper (December 14, 1946 – May 6, 2015) was an American free jazz musician. In addition to trap drums, Cooper played balafon, chirimia and various electronic instruments, and referred to himself as a "multi-dimensional drummer," meaning that his playing involved "layers of sounds and rhythms". AllMusic reviewer Ron Wynn called him "A sparkling drummer and percussionist... An excellent accompanist". Another Allmusic reviewer stated that "in the truest sense this drummer is a magician, adept at transformation and the creation of sacred space".

Career

Cooper studied with Oliver Coleman and Walter Dyett in the late 1950s and early 1960s, then studied at the American Conservatory of Music and Loop College. In 1968, he worked with Oscar Brown, Jr. and Kalaparusha Maurice McIntyre in the U.S. but moved to Europe before the end of the decade, where he played with Rahsaan Roland Kirk, Steve Lacy, Lou Bennett (with whom he visited Gambia and Senegal), the Art Ensemble of Chicago, Alan Silva, and Noah Howard. After returning to the U.S. in 1971, he joined the Revolutionary Ensemble alongside Leroy Jenkins and Sirone, where he remained for several years, and played piano, flute, and bugle in addition to drums. In the 1970s, he  played with Sam Rivers, George Adams, Karl Berger, Andrew Hill, and Anthony Braxton. In the 1980s he worked with McIntyre again, as well as with Cecil Taylor.

Death
Cooper died in Brooklyn on May 6, 2015, aged 68, from complications of multiple myeloma, according to his daughter, Levanah Cummins-Cooper.

Discography
As leader or co-leader

With the Revolutionary Ensemble
 1972: Vietnam (ESP-Disk)
 1972: Manhattan Cycles (India Navigation)
 1975: The Psyche (RE Records)
 1976: The Peoples Republic (A&M/Horizon)
 1977: Revolutionary Ensemble (Enja)
 2004: And Now... (Pi Recordings)
 2008: Beyond the Boundary of Time (Mutable)
 2012: Counterparts (Mutable)

As sideman
With Lester Bowie
 Fast Last! (Muse, 1974)

With Anthony Braxton
 New York, Fall 1974 (Arista, 1974)

With Ted Daniel
 Tapestry (Porter, 2008)

With Leroy Jenkins and The Jazz Composer's Orchestra
 For Players Only (JCOA, 1975)

With Rahsaan Roland Kirk
 Live in Paris, Vol. 1 (France's Concert Records, 1988)
 Live in Paris, Vol. 2 (France's Concert Records, 1988)
 Dog Years in the Fourth Ring (32 Jazz, 1970 [1997])

With Steve Lacy
 Wordless (Futura, 2009)

With Marcello Melis
 Perdas De Fogu (Vista, 1975)

With Roscoe Mitchell and Don Moye
 Wildflowers 5: The New York Loft Jazz Sessions (one track) (Douglas, 1997); released on CD as Wildflowers: The New York Loft Jazz Sessions - Complete (Knit Classics, 1999)

With Alan Silva
 Seasons (BYG Records, 1971)
 My Country (Leo, 1989)

With Cecil Taylor
 It is in the Brewing Luminous (hat Art, 1980)

With Clifford Thornton
 Communications Network (Third World, 1972)

References

1946 births
2015 deaths
American jazz drummers
Musicians from Chicago
Deaths from cancer in New York (state)
Deaths from multiple myeloma
Jazz musicians from Illinois
Revolutionary Ensemble members